The Victory Cup was a one-off Scottish football competition held in 1919 to celebrate the end of World War I. It is an unofficial competition in statistical terms, taking place at the end of the 1918–19 season just before official competitions such as the Scottish Cup resumed (the top division of the Scottish Football League continued during the conflict).

The winners of the Victory Cup were St Mirren who defeated Heart of Midlothian 3–0 after extra time in the final at Celtic Park in Glasgow.

Summary
The format was a straight knockout tournament involving clubs in the south and west of Scotland, with each round played as a single match with replays as necessary, and the final at a neutral venue. Matches took place between March and April 1919.

Due to the scarcity of materials and the swift manner in which the competition was organised, no trophy was available to be presented to the winners at the time; St Mirren instead received a 'Victory Cup Shield'. They received a trophy at a later time.

A similar wartime competition was held at the end of World War II, won by Rangers. Coincidentally, the manager of the losing team in that final (Willie McCartney of Hibernian) was the son of John McCartney, the Hearts manager in 1919.

Results

First round

Replays

Second round

Quarter-finals

Semi-finals

Final

See also
Heart of Midlothian F.C. and World War I

References

1918–19 in Scottish football
Defunct football cup competitions in Scotland
Wartime football in Scotland